Shriram Kuti is a villa and landmark in Amorha Khas village near Ram Janki Marg near Chhawani in Basti district in the Indian state of Uttar Pradesh..

Geography

References

Basti district